Hans-Uwe Pilz (born 10 November 1958) is a German former footballer.

He began his career with BSG Sachsenring Zwickau before joining Dynamo Dresden during the winter break of the 1981–82 season. He remained at Dynamo until German reunification when he moved west, following teammates Matthias Döschner and Andreas Trautmann to Fortuna Köln. However, he returned to Dynamo after a few months, and would play for the club until 1995, including four years in the Bundesliga. After the club suffered a double relegation in 1995, Pilz returned to FSV Zwickau, before retiring in 1997. He later had two brief spells as manager at Zwickau. During his career he won 35 caps for East Germany.

References

External links
 

1958 births
Living people
People from Hohenstein-Ernstthal
People from Bezirk Karl-Marx-Stadt
German footballers
East German footballers
Footballers from Saxony
East Germany international footballers
Association football sweepers
Association football midfielders
FSV Zwickau players
Dynamo Dresden players
SC Fortuna Köln players
Bundesliga players
2. Bundesliga players
German football managers
DDR-Oberliga players
FSV Zwickau managers